This is a list of singles that peaked in the Top 10 of the Irish Singles Chart during 2008 (see 2008 in Irish music).

 The "Top 10 Entry Date" is when the song entered the Top 10 for the first time.
 Songs that were still in the Top 10 at the beginning of 2008 but peaked in 2007 are provided in the 2007 Peaks segment at the bottom of the page.
 Songs that entered the Top 10 in 2008 but did not peak until 2009 are listed in List of top 10 singles in 2009 (Ireland).

Top 10 singles

Notes:
  - The single re-entered the Top 10 on 7 February 2008.
  - The single re-entered the Top 10 on 28 February 2008.
  - The single re-entered the Top 10 on 20 March 2008.
  - The single re-entered the Top 10 on 17 April 2008.
  - The single re-entered the Top 10 on 22 May 2008.
  - The single re-entered the Top 10 on 24 July 2008.
  - The single re-entered the Top 10 on 7 August 2008.
  - The single re-entered the Top 10 on 14 August 2008.
  - The single re-entered the Top 10 on 23 October 2008.
  - The single re-entered the Top 10 on 6 November 2008.
  - The single re-entered the Top 10 on 13 November 2008.
  - The single re-entered the Top 10 on 20 November 2008.
  - The single re-entered the top 10 on 27 November 2008.
  - The single peaked at #1 in 1987.
  - The singles re-entered the Top 10 on 1 January 2009.

2007 Peaks
 Leon Jackson - "When You Believe" (Peak #1, Weeks: 6)
 Timbaland featuring OneRepublic - "Apologize" (Peak #2, Weeks: 14)
 Leona Lewis - "Bleeding Love" (Peak: #1, Weeks: 12)
 Journey - "Don't Stop Believin'" (Peak #4, Weeks: 15)
 Shayne Ward - "Breathless" (Peak: #2, Weeks: 7)
 Take That - "Rule the World" (Peak: #3, Weeks: 10)
 Cascada - "What Hurts the Most" (Peak: #6, Weeks: 4)

See also
2008 in Irish music
List of number-one singles of 2008 (Ireland)

References

2008 in Irish music
Ireland Top 10 Singles
Irish music-related lists
Irish record charts